Greyhoundz is a Filipino nu metal/rap metal band formed in the late 1990s which gained international recognition and is currently based in Manila, Philippines.

Background
Greyhoundz was formed in 1997 by cousins Niño and Audie Avenido who at first just wanted to join a local battle of the bands contest together with other bandmates that included Allen Cudal. The contest was canceled so they opted to audition at the now defunct Club DREDD that was based in Manila.

They later recruited Reg Rubio, who was from another band that also played at Club Dredd and TJ Brillantes came on board shortly after.

In March 1999, the band signs with Sony Music Philippines. on August 1, 1999, The band launched their debut album "Seven Corners of Your Game" at NU 107's "In The Raw" radio show hosted by Francis Brew Reyes. the album has sold almost 10,000 copies in a month since its release. In May 2002, the album attained platinum status.

In March 2002, the band released their 2nd self titled album. the band released singles "Even" and "Pull". In May 2002 the band launch their first music video on their single "Your Puppet and Clown".

On May 6, 2004, Allen Cudal died from a car accident. The 2004 Pulp SummerSlam was the last time the band performed with their complete line up.

Despite the tragic event and as a sign of respect for their late bandmate, the group now performs as a four-piece band instead of hiring a new member.

On March 28, 2022, Project Ear along with Greyhoundz's Reg Rubio, Ian Tayao of Wilabaliw, and two former Slapshock Members Lean Ansing and Chi Evora released the single "Fade to Black". As a tribute for the late Slapshock frontman Jamir Garcia and rapper D-Coy.

Behind the name
The name “Greyhoundz” was borrowed from the former band of Audie Avenido's father.

Members
Reg Rubio - Vocals
Niño Avenido - Bass guitar
TJ Brillantes - Drums
Audie Avenido - Guitars

Former member(s)
Allen Cudal (deceased) - Guitars
B-Boy Garcia - turntables

Discography

Singles and videography
Singles
 Pigface
 Mr. P.I.G.
 Party at 802
 Taking U High (featuring Jamir Garcia of Slapshock, Ian Tayao of Cheese (later known as Queso), and Bogoy Espejo of Zooom)
 Leech
 Pull
 Even (Asian Edition Soundtrack Album from Spider-Man movie soundtrack)
 Your Puppet and Clown
 Karmic (featuring Ian Tayao of Cheese)
 Bonfires and Sandcastles
 Apoy
 Koro (featuring Gloc 9, Ocho Toleran of Queso, and Francis M.)
 Doble Kara
 Battle Cry (RF Online Theme)
 Shoot To Kill
 Gunner
 Dragon Flies
 Taya
 Gaba
 Ang Bagong Ako (feat. Loonie & B-Boy Garcia of Queso)
 Krus

Videos
 Your Puppet and Clown
 Hole
 Karmic featuring Ian Tayao of Queso
 Apoy
 Koro featuring Gloc 9, Ocho Toleran of Queso, and Francis M.
 Doble Kara
 Shoot To Kill
 Taya
 Ang Bagong Ako (featuring Loonie & B-Boy Garcia of Queso)
 Krus

Spider-Man official soundtrack
Greyhoundz’ song, "Even", was included in the official soundtrack of the blockbuster movie Spider-Man (2002), as one of the Asian Edition Bonus Tracks of the album. The soundtrack also features music from artists such as Alien Ant Farm, The Strokes, Macy Gray and Aerosmith. Greyhoundz is the only Filipino band included in this release. Also, their song, "Hole", was included in the soundtrack of the original The Ring

Awards and nominations

References

External links
Greyhoundz Official Yahoo! Groups
Greyhoundz Official Myspace
Greyhoundz at Rakista.com
Pinoy Band: Greyhoundz History Profile
Greyhoundz at Multiply
Greyhoundz Pinoy Banda Profile

Filipino rock music groups
Filipino heavy metal musical groups
Nu metal musical groups
Rap metal musical groups
MCA Music Inc. (Philippines) artists
Musical groups established in 1997
Musical groups from Metro Manila